Oh Yoon-hong is a South Korean actress and model. She is best known for her roles in dramas such as Who Are You: School 2015, Solomon's Perjury and The Scholar Who Walks the Night.

Filmography

Television series

Film

Ambassadorship
 20th Seoul International Alternative Film Arts Festival Ambassador

Awards and nominations
 Blue Dragon Film Award for Best New Actress and Supporting Actress in 2018

References

External links 
 
 

1971 births
Living people
21st-century South Korean actresses
South Korean female models
South Korean television actresses
South Korean film actresses
Dankook University alumni
Sogang University alumni
Chung-Ang University alumni